Taguig Science High School (commonly called as TagSci) is a public specialized secondary science school in the Philippines that specializes in science, english, and mathematics curriculum. 
Formerly known as a Science Special class, Taguig Science High School is located at its Annex branch in C.P. Tiñga Sports Complex, Hagonoy, Taguig City and Main branch in Brgy. San Miguel, Taguig City. Its establishment was made possible by the City Mayor Hon. Sigfrido R. Tiñga in collaboration with the Department of Education (Philippines)- Division of Taguig and Pateros, then Schools Division Superintendent, Jovita O. Calixihan.

School History

June 2002 

Taguig Science was formerly known as a Special Science class which initially housed 35 students each section on its academic year 2002-2003  which were temporarily housed at Signal Village National High School.

October 22, 2003 

A resolution endorsing the creation of Taguig Science High School was approved by the Office of the Division of Taguig and Pateros (TaPat) signed by the President of TAPASPA and PESPA and the Assistant Schools Division Superintendent and OIC Dr. Estrellita Putian.

November 10, 2003 

Dr. Estrellita Putian, OIC, submitted the Feasibility Study for the creation of Taguig Science High School to Councilor Myla Rodriguez Valencia, Chairman, Committee on Education, Municipality of Taguig.

December 9, 2003 

The Municipality of Taguig enacted Ordinance No. 104, s. 2003, an Ordinance establishing the Taguig Science High School to be funded by the Local School Board of Taguig.

February 13, 2004 

The Division Office of Taguig and Pateros through Dr. Rolando Magno, Schools Division Superintendent, forward a copy of the said ordinance to Hon. Edilberto de Jesus, Secretary of Education.

March 12, 2004 

The request of the local government for allocation of funds in the amount of Thirty Million Pesos (P30.0 M) for the construction of a two-storey (12 classrooms) school building with laboratories for the proposed Taguig Science and Technology Multi-Purpose Hall was referred to the DepEd-NCR by the Planning Office of DepEd, Central Office.

March 29, 2004 

The Regional Office denied the request of the local government re: the appropriation for the construction of the proposed Taguig Science High School.

April 1, 2004 

The Regional Office acknowledged the receipt of Ordinance No. 104, s. 2003 and requested the Division Office to submit the requirements for the establishment of Taguig Science High School as stipulated in DepEd Order No. 5, s. 1989.

June 4, 2004 

Additional requirements for the establishment of Taguig Science High School were requested from the Division Office by the Regional Office.

August 9, 2004 

The Division Office submitted to the regional Office the evaluated documents of the Taguig Science High School.

September 8, 2004 

An ocular inspection of the school was conducted by Dr. Luz Rojo, Chief of Secondary Education division and Mrs. Aurora A. Franco, Education Supervisor II

September 14–15, 2004 

In September 14, the Regional Office approved the establishment of Taguig Science High School.

In September 15, Taguig Science High School was founded and was officially declared as the first high school in Taguig that specializes the Science, Math and English curriculum.

June 2016 

Taguig Science High School opened its main campus at Brgy. San Miguel, Taguig City for the incoming Grade 7 and 10 and Senior High School of Academic Year 2016-2017. It initially housed approximately 300 Grade 10 Students and more than 200 Senior High School students.

It offered the Senior High School application, in accordance to the resolution that was ordered by the Department of Education, for incoming students which were separated into 2 tracks -Science and Technology, Engineering  and Mathematics (STEM) Track and Accountancy and Business Management (ABM) Track.

June 2017 

Since the opening of the new Senior High Building, Taguig Science High School was opened to most year levels of the Junior High School (Grades 7,9,10) and Senior High School (Grades 11 - 12). The Junior and Senior High school have their own dedicated buildings for the division of the year levels.

June 2018 
Taguig Science High School was opened to all year levels of the Junior High School (Grades 7-10) and Senior High School (Grades 11 - 12). The Junior and Senior High school have their own dedicated buildings for the division of the year levels.

Uniform 

When Lani Cayetano sat down as the new mayor of Taguig in 2010, the school uniforms of all public school students were changed to coordinate with the new mayor's theme color: pink. The uniforms were completely identical with other public schools in Taguig. The color scheme for the uniform are white blouse with pick necktie and pink skirt for females and white polo with gray lining on the pocket and gray pants for boys.

Every uniform must have the following in accordance to the school's policy.
 School Patch on the left side collar;
 Name Plate/Patch on the left breast of the uniform (upper portion of the polo pocket for male) and
 Official School Identification Card.

School Organizations

References

External links 
 

Science high schools in Metro Manila
Schools in Taguig
Educational institutions established in 2002
2002 establishments in the Philippines